KJRM-LP (93.3 FM, "Sonshine 93.3") was a low-power FM radio station licensed to McAlester, Oklahoma, United States. The station was last owned by JR Ministries Educational Association.

The station's license was surrendered to the Federal Communications Commission on February 16, 2023, and cancelled the same day.

References

External links
 

JRM-LP
JRM-LP
Defunct radio stations in the United States
Defunct religious radio stations in the United States
Pittsburg County, Oklahoma
Radio stations established in 2003
Radio stations disestablished in 2023
2003 establishments in Oklahoma
2023 disestablishments in Oklahoma
JRM-LP